The Filmfare Best Supporting Actor Award is and award presented annually by the Filmfare magazine as part of its annual Filmfare Awards South for Kannada films. It is given in honor of an actor who has delivered an outstanding performance in a supporting role while working within the Kannada film industry. Although the awards for Kannada films started in 1970, awards for the best supporting actor category started only in 2007. At the 54th Filmfare Awards South ceremony held in 2007, Rangayana Raghu was the first winner of this award for his role in Cyanide. Since its inception, the award has been given to eight actors. Achyuth Kumar has received the most awards in this category with three awards.

Superlatives

Winners and nominees

References

Supporting Actor